The Bangladesh Cricket League is an annual first-class cricket tournament that began in Bangladesh in the 2012–13 season.

History
The Bangladesh Cricket League (BCL) was inaugurated in the 2012–13 season as a four-team first-class tournament comprising the best-performing players from the eight-team National Cricket League (NCL). The aim was to raise the level of the nation's top first-class competition and so prepare players better for Test cricket.

The BCL consists of four zonal teams, each made up of players from teams representing two adjacent regions in the NCL. The teams are as follows:
 Central Zone: players from Dhaka Division and Dhaka Metropolis
 South Zone: players from Khulna Division and Barisal Division
 East Zone: players from Sylhet Division and Chittagong Division
 North Zone: players from Rajshahi Division and Rangpur Division

Each team is owned and officially named as a franchise: Islami Bank East Zone, for example. The matches are played on a limited number of nominally neutral grounds, without home and away matches.

Winners and runners-up

Statistics by team

Seasons

2012–13

In the final, Central Zone beat North Zone by 31 runs. Sanjamul Islam (North Zone) took 8 for 73 in the second innings of the final, which remained the best bowling figures in the tournament until the 2016–17 season.

Matches took place between December 2012 and February 2013, at Mirpur (in Central Zone) and Bogra (in North Zone). The highest scorer was Marshall Ayub (Central Zone) (465 runs, average 77.50) and the leading wicket-takers were Sohag Gazi (South Zone) (19 wickets, average 24.47) and Mosharraf Hossain (Central Zone) (19 wickets, average 25.31). Marshall Ayub was named player of the tournament; he scored 289 against East Zone, which remains the highest score in the tournament.

2013–14

In the final South Zone beat North Zone by 213 runs.

Matches took place in January and May 2014, the round-robin matches at Bangladesh Krira Shikkha Protisthan cricket grounds 2, 3 and 4 in Savar, and the final at Mirpur (all in Central Zone). The highest scorer was Imrul Kayes (South Zone) (511 runs, average 73.00) and the leading wicket-taker was Taijul Islam (North Zone) (37 wickets, average 17.24). Taijul Islam was named player of the tournament.

2014–15

There was no final. Matches took place in April and May 2015, at Fatullah and Mirpur (both in Central Zone) and Chittagong (in East Zone). The highest scorer was Alok Kapali (East Zone) (408 runs, average 102.00) and the leading wicket-taker was Abdur Razzak (South Zone) (18 wickets, average 19.00).

In April 2015, the BCL staged a One-Day League, which was won by East Zone.

2015–16

There was no final. Instead of a single round-robin, as in previous years, a double round-robin was held from mid-January to mid-March 2016. Matches were played at Rajshahi and Bogra (both in North Zone), Cox's Bazar (East Zone), and Mirpur and Fatullah (both in Central Zone). The highest scorer was Marshall Ayub (Central Zone), with 562 runs at 56.20, while Abdur Razzak (South Zone) took the most wickets, 38 at 32.15.

2016–17

A double round-robin was held from late January to early March 2017. The highest scorer was Tushar Imran (South Zone), with 731 runs at 91.37, while Sunzamul Islam (North Zone), 25 wickets at 26.44, and Shuvagata Hom (Central Zone), 25 at 26.92, took the most wickets. Sunzamul Islam took 9 for 80, a competition record, in the second innings against Central Zone at Chittagong.

2017–18

The first three rounds were played in January 2018, and the last three in April, split by the 2017–18 season of the Dhaka Premier Division Cricket League. The highest scorer was Liton Das (East Zone), with 779 runs at 97.37, while Abdur Razzak (South Zone) was the leading wicket-taker with 43 wickets at 25.00. Both totals were new records for the competition.

2018–19

The tournament was played in November and December 2018. The highest scorer was Anamul Haque (South Zone), with 658 runs at 65.80, while Abdur Razzak (South Zone) was once again the leading wicket-taker with 34 wickets at 24.88.

2019–20

In the final, South Zone beat East Zone by 105 runs.
The tournament was played from late January to late February 2020. The highest scorer was again Anamul Haque (South Zone), with 501 runs, while Abdur Razzak (South Zone) was once again the leading wicket-taker with 22 wickets.

2021–22

In the final, Central Zone beat South Zone by four wickets. The round-robin matches were played in December 2021 and the final in January 2022. The highest scorer was Mithun Ali (Central Zone), with 468 runs, while Hasan Murad (Central Zone) was the leading wicket-taker with 22 wickets.

References

External links
 Bangladesh Cricket Board
 Tournaments in Bangladesh at CricketArchive

 
First-class cricket competitions
Bangladeshi domestic cricket competitions